Rohan Chand (born January 25, 2004) is an American teen actor. He has appeared in films such as Jack and Jill, Lone Survivor, and Bad Words. He also appeared in the "Crossfire" episode of Homeland. He made a cameo appearance in Jumanji: Welcome to the Jungle in 2017.  He starred as Mowgli in the Warner Bros film Mowgli: Legend of the Jungle released on Netflix in 2018.

Life and career
Chand was born in New York City, to parents of Indian descent. When he was six years old, he was spotted by a casting director while playing baseball; the casting director was the mother of another child playing baseball, and encouraged Chand to audition for a role in Adam Sandler's film Jack and Jill. Chand ultimately won the role of Sandler's on-screen adopted son, and the film was released in 2011. His next role was in a 2011 episode of Homeland titled "Crossfire", in which he played Issa Nazir, the young son of the series' central terrorist who forms a close relationship with an American soldier, played by Damian Lewis. In the 2013 film Lone Survivor, Chand played the son of an Afghan who provides assistance to an American Navy SEAL (played by Mark Wahlberg), and spoke in Hindi and Urdu for the part.

In 2013, Chand appeared in a main role in the comedy film Bad Words, playing Chaitanya Chopra, a spelling bee entrant who befriends the film's main character (played by Jason Bateman) after auditioning when he was eight years old. He was ten years old by the time of the film's release and his performance was widely praised by critics, with a writer for Variety magazine predicting that Chand would receive "many more big screen opportunities following this endearingly wide-eyed turn". His next project was the 2014 film The Hundred-Foot Journey directed by Lasse Hallström and starring Helen Mirren, in which he played the young version of the film's main character (played by Manish Dayal).

In April 2014 it was announced that Chand would star alongside Lea Michele in DreamWorks Animation's Bollywood-style musical, Bollywood Superstar Monkey. In addition, Chand was cast in Andy Serkis' Mowgli: Legend of the Jungle, in the leading role of Mowgli. The film was released in November 2018.

Filmography

Films

Television

References

External links
 

Living people
American male child actors
American male film actors
American male television actors
Male actors from New York City
21st-century American male actors
American male actors of Indian descent
2004 births